The Madurese (sometimes Madurace or Madhurâ; also known as Orang Madura and Suku Madura in Indonesian)  are an ethnic group originally from the island of Madura now found in many parts of Indonesia, where they are the third-largest ethnic group by population. Common to most Madurese throughout the archipelago is the Islamic religion and the use of the Madurese language.

The Madurese are a religious ethnicity, often affiliated with Nahdlatul Ulama, a traditionalist Indonesian Muslim organization. Pesantren has a pivotal role in Madurese life.

While the Madurese have their roots on Madura off the northeastern coast of Java, the majority of Madurese do not now live on that island. The Madurese people have migrated out of Madura over several hundred years, mostly driven by poor agricultural resources in their home island. The majority have settled on Java, where an estimated six million Madurese live, especially in East Java where they form about half the population.

Population and distribution 
Official and academic data on the population of Madurese people vary considerably. During the nationwide population census conducted in Indonesia in 2010, the Madurese people make up 3.03% of the country's population, that is 7,179,356 people. On the other hand, some scientific sources operate with significantly larger figures around 10.5 to 10.8 million people. In any case, the Madurese people are among the largest ethnics of Indonesia, thus, according to the statistics of the 2010 census, they occupy the fourth largest ethnic group after the Javanese people, Sundanese people and Batak people.

Historically, the Madurese people inhabit Madura Island and located to the east of it, a group of smaller islands in Java Sea such as Kambing Island, Sapudi Islands and Kangean Islands. Here they number about 3.3 million people, which is more than 90% of the population in these territories. Approximately the same number of Madurese people living in the eastern end of the Java Island, and more than 400,000 people in various parts of the Indonesian part of the island of Kalimantan. In addition, tens of thousands of the Madurese people live in other regions of Indonesia; especially, there are significant Madurese communities in the capital city of Jakarta (about 80,000 people), in Bali (about 30,000 people) and in the province of Bangka Belitung Islands (more than 15,000 people). There are also small Madurese communities in the countries of Southeast Asia adjacent to Indonesia, particularly, in Singapore.

Language 

The Madurese people speak the Madurese language, which belongs to the Austronesian family, more specifically the Malayo-Sumbawan group. It is divided into several dialects. Linguistically, there are different points of view regarding the dialects of the Madurese language. Older works would normally identify two or four dialects, but modern specialists have concluded that there are six dialects. The most developed dialect in the lexical terms is the Sumenep dialect, which underlies the literary Madurese language. The most common dialect is Bangkalan, which often functions as a lingua franca between Madurese people from different localities.

In some parts of East Java among a significant number of Madurese population, a peculiar mixed of Madurese-Javanese dialect has formed. In addition to these native languages, many are also fluent in Indonesian, the national language.

Religion 
The majority of Madurese practice Sunni Islam. Characteristically, unlike a significant part of their fellow religious Indonesian, Madurese people enjoy the reputation of very zealous adherents of Islam. Muslim theologians play an important role in their spiritual and social life. A significant part of the Madurese people is trained in traditional Pesantren Muslim schools, which play an important role in their spiritual and social life.

There are also Madurese who practice other religions, such as Christianity (both Protestantism and Catholicism) making up not more than 0.2%, and the rest of the other proportion of those professing other religions is extremely small such as Hinduism. Protestant Madurese can be found in northeastern part of Jember Regency, where they have a church that delivers sermon in Madurese, located in Sumberpakem village, Sumberjambe district. The church is a member of East Java Christian Church.

Socio-economic structure

Basic livelihood 

Family is important to the Madurese and they commonly live in villages that function around an Islamic religious center. According to Islamic law, a man may have more than one wife. Marriage proposals are usually made by the groom's parents, preferably to a first or second cousin. If the proposal is accepted, the bride's parents are then presented with the "bride price", which is usually cattle. The groom's parents then set the date for the upcoming wedding. Newlywed couples often live with the bride's family. Islam is an integral part of the social, political and economic life of the Madurese.

The main traditional occupations of the Madurese are animal farming, which mainly includes breeding of cattle, goats, horses, poultry and fighting cocks. The Madurese are known for herding cattle, hence they are often referred by a common nickname as the "cowboys" of Indonesia. Cattle are an important part of the culture, and bull-racing is one of their favorite sports.

Agriculture among the Madurese people on the island of Madura is poorly developed due to low fertility and very poor soil conditions, thus farming is not important in Madurese culture. As a result, the Madurese tend not to farm, unless on other islands with very good soil conditions, such as the Madurese people in Java, where agriculture is practiced more widely and have developed to a lesser degree. The main crops are such as corn, cassava, rice, tobacco, beans and cloves. Among craftsmen, tanning, pottery, batik manufacturing, blacksmithing, as well as small vassals and boat builders are also important occupations. In coastal areas, the Madurese are actively engaged in fishing, trading and as well as extraction of salt (from Madura Island). Lastly, the Madurese people also enjoyed a reputation in the region as skilled seafarers. Madurese residents of large cities, particularly in eastern Surabaya are actively involved in modern economic sectors.

Settlements 
Traditional Madurese settlements are scattered and rarely linear in layout, depending rather on the direction of the roads. In most villages, there are paddocks for cattle rearing. Houses are made of bamboo and often built on low stilts. They have a frame structure usually supplemented with a veranda. Roofs are covered with palm leaves or reeds, however from the last third of the 20th century, the usage of roof tiles is increasingly common.

Transmigration 

Low yields on soils had long served the cause of mass migrant labor and the relocation of the local population outside the island, where the Madurese were major clients of the government's large-scale transmigration programmes undertaken by both the Dutch colonial administration as well as the authorities of independent Indonesia in the nineteenth and twentieth centuries, through which they settled in relatively sparsely populated areas of Indonesia's other islands, especially Kalimantan. As a result of this program, more than half of the ethnic Madurese people currently living outside of their customary homeland had settled in many regions of Indonesia, where communities of former transmigrants and their descendants that still maintain their Madurese identity.

Madurese people have lived on the territory of Java for several centuries, forming the ethnic majority  in some of the north-eastern regions of the island. They tend to get along well with the Javanese people in relation to language, culture, and way of life. Mixed marriages between Javanese and Madurese people are also common. Moreover, in some areas of eastern Java, there are significant communities of descendants of such pendalungan marriages, which are distinguished by their unique cultural traditions that combine Madurese and Javanese elements to varying degrees.

Another situation often develops in the provinces of West Kalimantan and Central Kalimantan, where Madurese people resettled under the transmigration programmes in 1900 to 1950 in the span of 90 years. Some of these migrant groups have been the subject of conflict with Dayak communities. The native population, especially the Dayaks were quite wary of strangers, and seeing them as a threat to their traditional livelihoods. Mutual distrust also promote ethnic and cultural and religious differences, where most Dayak people practices Christianity or Kaharingan. The most publicized conflict has been on various localities in Kalimantan, where thousands were killed in a series of large scale armed fighting between the Madurese and the Dayak people during the late 1990s.

In West Kalimantan there was communal violence between Dayaks and Madurese in 1996, in the Sambas conflict in 1999 and the Sampit conflict 2001, resulting in large scale massacres of Madurese. In the Sambas conflict, both Malays and Dayaks people massacred the Madurese people. Tens of thousands of Madurese people from Kalimantan were forced to move to Madura and Java. By the mid-2000s, the situation has somewhat stabilized and enabled the return of most of the Madurese resettlement back in Kalimantan.

Culture

Cuisine

For the Madurese people, their traditional cuisine is characterized by a fairly large use of meat; of which primarily prepare miniature skewers called satay accompanied with special sweet marinade and thick sharp sauce, has enjoyed a wide popularity in many parts of Indonesia. In addition, traditional Madurese culinary are characterized by the active use of corn and, in general, greater salinity of dishes compared to other regional cuisines of the country.

Folk art and traditional attire 

Culturally the Madurese people are close enough to eastern Javanese that they share similar forms of folklore, music (including gamelan), dance, and shadow theater or wayang. The traditional attire, however, is very specific to the Madurese people. Men would wear a completely black long-skirted coat with a wide belt, which most often hooks under a shirt that comes in broad red and white stripes, along with a checkered sarong. While women would have donned a dark blue or mottled jacket over a sarong.

Bull racing 

A truly unique tradition of the islanders is bull racing, known as Karapan sapi, where local bred bulls harnessed in special light carts are led by a charioteer, usually a young man or teenager. Such competitions are typical of Madura, where they serve as its main tourist attraction. Races are held annually in August and October in different localities, after which their winners compete in the final round, which is traditionally held in Pamekasan. Races are usually accompanied by gamelan performances and folk festivities.

By the end of the 1980s, the popularity of Madurese bull racing had grown so much that the winner of the competition would be awarded with a prize on behalf of the president of Indonesia. In addition, the scene of the races was depicted on the reverse of coins of 100 Indonesian rupiah, produced from 1991 to 1998.

Brawling 
Traditionally in terms of socio-economic life of the Madurese people, there had been a visible impact on their national character. They are often characterized as hard workers, stubborn, courageous, possessing integrity, loyal, generous, fair; and, at the same time, sharpness, resentment, extreme frugality, isolation, arrogant, hot-tempered, prone to violence and distrust towards strangers - especially against the backdrop of kindness and sociability of their neighbors such as the Javanese people.

In rural areas, the Madurese still practice an ancient tradition of vendetta, called  (also spelled charok) which literally means "battle of honor". In the 1990s, law enforcement agencies in each of the four districts in Madura have recorded dozens of cases each year. The killing may provoke resentment, quite small by the standards of ordinary European or Indonesian. According to local criminal statistics, most of the reason for such attacks are usually molestation of women or property dispute, but it often happens that the Madurese's cruel revenge is motivated by an insufficiently polite treatment or insult in public places to one's honor.

Instrument of revenge used in this dueling is often the traditional Madurese crescent knife, celurit which is the most common peasant weapon and in some areas and also the attribute of traditional male attire. In such cases, the avenger usually prepares the celurit in advance in an event of dueling by casting special spells on the weapon.

Sometimes in the "battle of honor" are involved several people from each side - relatives and friends of the offender and the offended, and then it turns into a bloodbath. Such massive bloodshed have repeatedly occurred in Madura even in the 21st century. The most famous incident in recent years, a mass carok occurred on 13 July 2006 in Bujur Tengah village, Pamekasan Regency, East Java, Indonesia, resulting stabbing and killing of seven men and seriously injuring nine people.

References

Further reading
 

Ethnic groups in Indonesia
East Java
Madura Island
Madurese people